The 1914 Alma Maroon and Cream football team represented Alma College during the 1914 college football season.

Schedule

References

Alma
Alma Scots football seasons
Alma Maroon and Cream football